Hannibal Central School District serves the town of Hannibal, Oswego County, New York and includes:
Hannibal High School
(Dennis M.) Kenney Middle School
Fairley Elementary School

As of 2011, the district had a total enrollment of 1,514.

Athletics
Hannibal competes in the American division of the OHSL Liberty League, and Section III of the New York State Public High School Athletic Association (NYSPHSAA). All athletics are in Class B except for Cross Country being placed in Class C.  Hannibal has many accomplishments throughout its sports programs including League and Section championships and New York State Scholar Athletes.

Cross Country
The Warriors are coached by Dan "P Dawg” Pawlewicz, who has built a powerhouse program. 
 Section Champions: 1972, 2012
 2012 3rd Place NYSPHSAA Class C
 League Champions: 1972, 2012, 2015
 2011 McQuaid Invitational Champions

2012 Section Champions Roster

 Ryan Perry, Kyle Cooper, Ben "Speed Lightning" Slate, Erick Xavier Febus, Jason "McQuaid" McFarland, Frank "The Tank" Lackey, Zane-O Pointon, Blake "The Snake" Farnham, Ben Raymond

Individual Accomplishments

 Jason "McQuaid" McFarland 
 2014 & 2015 Section 3 Class C Champion  
 2015 - 4th in NYSPHSAA Class C
 2015 - 25th NYS Federation meet
 2014 - 11th in NYSPHSAA Class C
 2013 - 33rd in NYSPHSAA Class C
 2012 apart of the 3rd place NYSPHSAA Class C team and Section 3 Class C Champions
 2014 & 2015 All CNY Team 
 Competed at the NYSPHSAA meet all 4 years of his career
 OHSL League Champion 2014 & 2015
 JV McQuaid winner in 2012
 Freshman Speed Rating Record 151
 School Speed Rating Record 181
 Final Ranking of 2nd in NYS Class C
 Ryan Perry
 2012 Section 3 Class C Champion
 2nd place 2012 OHSL Championship
 2012 All CNY Team
 Ben Griffin
 3rd Section 3 Class C
 8th NYSPHSAA Class C
 Ben Slate
 8th place Section 3 Class C
 3rd OHSL Championship
 Zane Pointon
 2013 1st place Section 3 Class B Steeplechase

Football
In 2005 and 2006 Hannibal's high school football team advanced to the Dome where the Syracuse Orange play. Both seasons ended with a 9 -1 record.

Soccer

Boys Basketball

Girls Basketball

Indoor Track & Field
Coached by Dan Pawlewicz and Dom Pike

Outdoor Track & Field

Coached by Dom Pike

Baseball

Athletes to turn Pro

 Josh Shortslef Drafted 179th overall in the 6th round to the Pittsburgh Pirates in 2000
 Jake Shortslef Drafted Round 26 to the Texas Rangers in 2015 after playing for Herkimer Community College

Jake Shortslef hold the Section III record for most strikeouts in a game with 20. The 20 strikeouts was a Hannibal record and tied a Section III record held by West Genesee's Kevin Krause in 1991 and by Mexico's Jeff Hains in 2006.

Softball

References

School districts in New York (state)
Education in Oswego County, New York